Mary Gertrude Banahan (c. 1856 – 17 March 1932) was a Catholic religious sister and teacher from New Zealand . She was born in Ireland, where she joined the Brigidine Sisters as a novice in 1873. She and other sisters immigrated to Australia in 1883, to operate a school.  In 1898, she was part of a group of sisters invited to establish the Brigidine order in  Masterton, New Zealand.  She helped establish St Bride's Convent at Masterton.
 Banahan served as superior in several convents until her death in 1932.

References

New Zealand educators
Irish emigrants to New Zealand (before 1923)
People from Masterton
People from County Laois
19th-century Irish nuns
1856 births
1932 deaths
20th-century New Zealand Roman Catholic nuns
Irish emigrants to colonial Australia
Brigidine Sisters